Aimsun Live is a simulation-based traffic forecasting solution, developed and marketed by Aimsun.

Traffic control centres use Aimsun Live (formerly Aimsun Online) to make real-time decisions about the management of a road network. It is used to dynamically forecast future traffic conditions based on the current state of the network, and to evaluate incident response or traffic management strategies.
 
Aimsun Live connects with the traffic control centre, continuously processing live field data. By combining these live traffic data feeds and high-speed simulations with the emulation of congestion mitigation strategies, Aimsun Live can accurately forecast the future network flow patterns that will result from a particular traffic management or information provision strategy. From a single highway corridor to an entire major city, Aimsun Live can simulate vehicle movement within the road network.

Aimsun Live was launched in 2008 and is now fully deployed in Interstate 15 in San Diego, Grand Lyon in France and other locations worldwide.

Product features 

Aimsun Live uses live traffic data feeds and simulations to forecast future traffic conditions for large Urban areas and regional networks.

Real-time analysis 

Aimsun Live analyses real-time inputs from disparate sources of information, such as field traffic controllers, detectors, incident reports and live data feeds from key intersections.

Calibrated model retrieval 

Using up-to-date field data, Aimsun Live identifies, retrieves and loads a travel demand matrix of the road network being managed. It finds the closest match between the data received in real time from among several demand patterns stored in a database. The demand pattern database is created in a prior step by carrying out analysis of historical data.

Real-time simulation 

This step involves dynamic (mesoscopic or microscopic) simulation of one or more scenarios in real time. Each scenario is simulated on a dedicated computer. The simulations produce dynamic forecasts of traffic conditions at a detailed, local level for the next 30–60 minutes. Each simulation considers a concrete set of actions that might be applied in order to improve the network situation. One of the scenarios always corresponds to the ‘do nothing' case.

The area included in the simulation model depends on the type of network being managed. It is typically defined using equilibrium assignment techniques which evaluate at a high level the impact of local but significant capacity changes on the rest of the network. The objective is to exclude areas that are unlikely to be affected by incidents or responses to those incidents.

Simulations typically last 1–3 minutes depending on hardware specifications, network size and level of congestion (number of vehicles). These simulations are run in 'batch mode' (without animation in 2D or 3D) in order to improve performance.

Online visualisation 

Response information is presented visually online to provide support for operational decision making. Traffic control operators are provided with quick snapshots of predicted traffic flow and performance indicators for different control alternatives.

Other features 

 Customization to work with traffic control software 
 Assimilation of new data to improve quality of predictions over time

Practical uses 

 Online travel information systems
 Dynamic emergency vehicle routing
 Emissions management
 Accident response strategy assessments
 Urban and interurban congestion management
 Security threat mitigation and large-scale evacuation management

Project examples 

Aimsun Live is or has been used to inform operational decisions for:

 Network Emissions / Vehicle Flow Management Adjustment toolkit (NEVFMA) in collaboration with Oxfordshire County Council, EarthSense and Siemens Mobility. An Aimsun Live deployment, with integrated air dispersion modeling. 
 Central Florida Regional Integrated Corridor Management System for Florida DOT in collaboration with Southwest Research Institute. Aimsun Live is the predictive engine that will analyze and forecast the effectiveness of response plans to mitigate congestion.
Wiesbaden: DIGI-V - for the City of Wiesbaden. Aimsun is working in collaboration with Siemens Mobility to help lower traffic-related nitrogen oxide emissions with an extensive air pollution control package covering all areas of mobility. To achieve this reduction in traffic-related emissions, extensive environmental and traffic data will be recorded, analysed and processed in real time.
Sydney: M4 Smart Motorway System - for Transport for New South Wales. Aimsun Live is the traffic prediction software at the heart of the NSW Government's M4 Smart Motorway project. The project uses real-time data, communications and ITS to improve traffic flow.
Singapore: 2019 technology trial for real-time traffic simulation and prediction - Land Transport Authority of Singapore (LTA). Aimsun collaborated with the Land Transport Authority of Singapore (LTA) to develop a real-time traffic simulation and predictive system in Aimsun Live.
Integrated Corridor Management Project on Interstate 15, San Diego, CA - for SANDAG. In 2014 and again in 2016, the project received the Operational Efficiency Program of the Year award from the California Transportation Foundation.
 Leicester: Urban Traffic Management and Air Quality (uTRAQ) study for the European Space Agency in collaboration with TRL and the University of Leicester. Satellite-generated atmospheric data helped local authorities to devise real-time traffic management strategies for reducing pollution levels. 
 OPTICITIES - Grand Lyon. This three-year, EC-backed pilot project showed how prediction tools could help traffic centre operators anticipate and mitigate congestion, particularly at peak times.
 M30, Madrid, Spain Aimsun built and implemented a simulation-based traffic forecasting system for traffic evacuation and incident response operations in the Madrid traffic control center.

References

Further reading 
 
 
 
 
 
 Bola de cristal del tráfico, El Periódico de Catalunya, 23 Feb 2009
Integrated Corridor Management on I-15 in San Diego, Traffic Technology Today, Dan Lukasik, A.: March 2013
Local traffic patterns extraction with network-wide consistency in large urban networks, International Symposium of Transport Simulation (ISTS’18) and the International Workshop on Traffic Data Collection and its Standardization (IWTDCS’18) - Transportation Research Procedia 00 (2018) 000–000, Yaroslav Hernandez, Tamara Djukic, Jordi Casas, 2018  
Assessing spatiotemporal correlations from data for short-term traffic prediction using multi-task learning, International Symposium of Transport Simulation (ISTS’18) and the International Workshop on Traffic Data Collection and its Standardization (IWTDCS’18) - Transportation Research Procedia 00 (2018) 000–000, Rafael Mena-Yedra, Jordi Casas, Ricard Gavaldà, 2018
A data-driven method for OD matrix estimation, Transportation Research Part C: Emerging Technologies, Panchamy Krishnakumari, Hans van Lint, Tamara Djukic, Oded Cats, May 2019

External links 
 Aimsun Live official website

Transportation planning